Mahamadou Diarra (born 18 May 1981) is a Malian former professional footballer who played as a defensive midfielder. He served as captain for the Mali national team.

Club career

OFI Crete
Diarra started his professional career at Greek club OFI at the age of 17, being signed after recommendation of his elder brother Harouna, who had joined the club a year earlier. After a single season at Greece and being watched by clubs such as Barcelona and Milan, he decided to join Dutch club Vitesse.

Vitesse
Diarra made his debut for Vitesse on 13 August 1999. During his tenure at the club, his playing style was compared to Ruud Gullit and attracted interest from Juventus, then coached by Carlo Ancelotti. During the summer of 2002, after receiving offers from many European clubs, Vitesse sold Diarra to Lyon by €4 million, although the player favoured a move to Ajax to rejoin his old manager Ronald Koeman. Diarra played a total of 69 league matches and scored nine times for the Arnhem-based club.

Lyon
At Lyon, Diarra was a starter in each of his four seasons, playing alongside Michael Essien and Juninho Pernambucano in the midfield and helping his side to win the Ligue 1 in each of those seasons.

Real Madrid
After Real Madrid head coach Fabio Capello asked club president Ramón Calderón to sign "three players", "Diarra, Diarra and Diarra", Real Madrid joined Manchester United in the race to sign the midfielder. Lyon said that Diarra could not leave and put a €40 million price tag on him. However, on 18 August 2006, Real Madrid agreed a fee of €26 million and four days later, Diarra was unveiled at the Santiago Bernabéu Stadium by Calderón and was assigned the number 6 shirt.

During the 2006–07 season, Diarra was a staple in Capello's two-defensive midfielder system. He appeared in 33 of Madrid's 38 matches, scoring three times. On 18 June 2007, with Real Madrid needing to win against Mallorca to win the Liga for the first time since 2003, Diarra scored an 81st-minute header to give Madrid a 2–1 lead. In the 84th minute, José Antonio Reyes scored a third goal to ensure Real Madrid were champions.

Diarra played a pivotal role in the 2007–08 title defence under new head coach Bernd Schuster, and he established himself as the first-choice defensive midfielder, causing teammate Fernando Gago to play higher upfield. Real Madrid comfortably won the Liga, finishing eight points clear of second-placed Villarreal. Diarra had now been a league champion for six consecutive seasons, after winning Ligue 1 with Lyon between 2002–03 and 2005–06, and La Liga with Real Madrid in 2006–07 and 2007–08.

In October 2008, while playing an international fixture for Mali against Chad, Diarra was stretchered off the field after receiving a blow to his knee. He was rested for a month and made his next appearance in late November, but was forced to undergo surgery after aggravating his knee injury, which ruled him out for the remainder of the 2008–09 season. In his absence, Real Madrid signed Lassana Diarra from Portsmouth as a replacement defensive midfielder, who was issued Diarra's number 6 shirt. After recovering from injury, Diarra only started 8 further matches in two seasons for Real Madrid. In January 2011, it was reported that Diarra would be leaving Real Madrid, and was linked to several clubs including Málaga.

Monaco

Diarra returned to French football after signing with Monaco on 27 January 2011. He made his debut in a 0–0 draw against Marseille. Diarra left Monaco after the club was relegated to Ligue 2 at the end of the 2010–11 season. After his departure, he remained without a club for the first half of the 2011–12 season and was linked with moves to the Middle East and English Championship club Doncaster Rovers.

Fulham
Diarra signed for Premier League side Fulham on 26 February 2012. He agreed to a contract for the remainder of the 2011–12 season, with an option for the 2012–13 season. He made his Fulham debut as a substitute against Wolverhampton Wanderers on 4 March, assisting the fifth goal in a 5–0 win. On 17 March, he made his first start for Fulham in a 3–0 home loss to Swansea City. He scored his first goal for Fulham against Bolton Wanderers on 7 April 2012.

After impressing manager Martin Jol throughout his 11 Premier League match, on 17 May, Diarra signed a new one-year contract at the club, keeping him at Craven Cottage until the end of the 2012–13 season.

Diarra was one of 12 players released by Fulham at the end of the 2012–13 season. Despite his release, Martin Jol remained positive on Diarra and vowed to help him over the summer to continue his rehabilitation.

Diarra re-signed for Fulham on 26 March 2014 on a contract that expired at the end of the 2013–14 season in an ultimately unsuccessful attempt to help the club survive relegation.

Later career 

Diarra trained with Championship side Brentford throughout the 2016–17 season and made an appearance for the club's B team on 20 September 2016.

Style of play
FourFourTwo magazine described Diarra's playing style with the following forwards in 2006: "Diarra provides aggression, tactical awareness, toughness and the discipline that other players simply lack."

Personal life
Diarra is a practising Muslim. He observes fasting during the Islamic month of Ramadan, he maintains that "every coach has respected my decision".

Career statistics

Club

Notes

International

Scores and results list Mali's goal tally first, score column indicates score after each Diarra goal.

Honours
Lyon
Ligue 1: 2002–03, 2003–04, 2004–05, 2005–06
Trophée des Champions: 2002, 2003, 2004, 2005, 2006

Real Madrid
La Liga: 2006–07, 2007–08
Supercopa de España: 2008

Mali
FIFA U-20 World Cup bronze:1999

References

External links
 
 
 

1981 births
Living people
Sportspeople from Bamako
Malian Muslims
Malian footballers
Association football midfielders
Mali international footballers
2002 African Cup of Nations players
2004 African Cup of Nations players
2008 Africa Cup of Nations players
2010 Africa Cup of Nations players
Malian expatriate footballers
Expatriate footballers in Greece
Expatriate footballers in the Netherlands
Expatriate footballers in France
Expatriate footballers in Spain
Expatriate footballers in Monaco
Expatriate footballers in England
OFI Crete F.C. players
Olympique Lyonnais players
AS Monaco FC players
SBV Vitesse players
Real Madrid CF players
JS Centre Salif Keita players
Fulham F.C. players
Super League Greece players
Eredivisie players
Ligue 1 players
La Liga players
Premier League players
Malian expatriate sportspeople in Greece
Malian expatriate sportspeople in the Netherlands
Malian expatriate sportspeople in France
Malian expatriate sportspeople in Spain
Malian expatriate sportspeople in Monaco
Malian expatriate sportspeople in the United Kingdom
Mali under-20 international footballers
21st-century Malian people